The 2019–20 season was Getafe Club de Fútbol's 36th season in existence and the club's 3rd consecutive season in the top flight of Spanish football. In addition to the domestic league, Getafe participated in this season's edition of the Copa del Rey, and also participated in the UEFA Europa League. The season was slated to cover a period from 1 July 2019 to 30 June 2020. It was extended extraordinarily beyond 30 June due to the COVID-19 pandemic in Spain.

Players

Squad

Reserve team

Out of squad

Out on loan

Transfers

In

Out

Kits

Pre-season and friendlies

Competitions

Overview

La Liga

League table

Results summary

Results by round

Matches
The La Liga schedule was announced on 4 July 2019.

Copa del Rey

UEFA Europa League

Group stage

Knockout phase

Round of 32

Round of 16

Statistics

Squad statistics
Last updated on 5 August 2020

|-
! colspan=14 style=background:#dcdcdc; text-align:center|Goalkeepers

|-
! colspan=14 style=background:#dcdcdc; text-align:center|Defenders

|-
! colspan=14 style=background:#dcdcdc; text-align:center|Midfielders

|-
! colspan=14 style=background:#dcdcdc; text-align:center|Forwards

|-
! colspan=14 style=background:#dcdcdc; text-align:center| Players who have made an appearance or had a squad number this season but have left the club

|}

Goalscorers

Clean sheets

References

External links

Getafe CF seasons
Getafe
2019–20 UEFA Europa League participants seasons